Haumania is a genus of plants native to parts of central Africa. As of March 2022, Kew and Plants of the World Online accepts that it only contains 3 recognized species:

Haumania danckelmaniana (J.Braun & K.Schum.) Milne-Redh., Kew Bull. 5: 162 (1950). - Africa (Central African Republic, Cameroon, Equatorial Guinea, Gabon, Congo-Brazzaville, Congo-Kinshasa) 
Haumania leonardiana C.M.Evrard & Bamps, Bull. Jard. Bot. État Bruxelles 29: 370 (1959). - Congo-Kinshasa
Haumania liebrechtsiana (De Wild. & T.Durand) J.Léonard, Bull. Jard. Bot. État Bruxelles 19: 454 (1949). - Africa (Cabinda, Gabon, Congo-Brazzaville, Congo-Kinshasa) 

Kew does not accept Haumania microphylla Hoogland, Blumea, Suppl. 4: 228 (1958). - New Guinea and Haumania walkeri Ohwi, J. Jap. Bot. 33: 212 (1958). - Japan as valid species.

References

Marantaceae
Zingiberales genera